CJMP-FM is a Canadian radio station, which broadcasts at 90.1 FM in Powell River, British Columbia. The station's license was originally owned and operated by the Powell River Model Community Project, and on May 5, 2010, the Powell River Community Radio Society received CRTC approval to acquire Powell River Model Community Project and a new broadcasting licence to continue the operation of CJMP-FM.

CJMP-FM received its original approval by the CRTC in 2002, and was granted a new license in 2006. Under the CRTC's licensing regulations for developmental community radio stations, the station was required to submit a new license application rather than a simple renewal of its existing license.

References

External links
 CJMP-FM
 
 

Jmp
Powell River, British Columbia
Jmp
Radio stations established in 2002
2002 establishments in British Columbia